is a railway station on the Tsugaru Line in the town of Sotogahama, Aomori, Japan, operated by East Japan Railway Company (JR East).

Lines

Station layout
Kanita Station has one side platform and one island platform connected by a footbridge, serving a total of four tracks (one track is a siding). The station is attended, and has a Midori no Madoguchi staffed ticket office.

Platforms

History

Kanita Station was opened on December 5, 1951 as a station operated by Japanese National Railways (JNR). With the privatization of the JNR on April 1, 1987, it came under the operational control of JR East. Services on the Tsugaru Kaikyō Line began on March 13, 1988, and ceased operations on March 26, 2016 when the Hokkaido Shinkansen opened and replaced regular passenger services connecting Aomori and Hakodate.

Passenger statistics
In fiscal 2016, the station was used by an average of 164 passengers daily (boarding passengers only)

Bus services
 Tairadate area line bus

Surrounding area

Sotogahama center hospital
Sotogahama town office
Kanita post office

See also
 List of Railway Stations in Japan

External links

References

Stations of East Japan Railway Company
Railway stations in Japan opened in 1951
Railway stations in Aomori Prefecture
Tsugaru Line
Tsugaru-Kaikyō Line
Sotogahama, Aomori